Bearskin Creek is a  long 3rd order tributary to Richardson Creek in Union County, North Carolina.

Course
Bearskin Creek rises at the Monroe Airport and then flows east to join Richardson Creek in Monroe, North Carolina at Sutton Park.

Watershed
Bearskin Creek drains  of area, receives about 48.5 in/year of precipitation, has a wetness index of 457.88, and is about 28% forested.

References

Rivers of North Carolina
Rivers of Union County, North Carolina